Little Rock has a humid subtropical climate (Köppen Cfa), with hot, usually humid summers, but subject to drought, primarily in late summer. According to the Trewartha climate classification system, Little Rock is subtropical because nine of its months exceed 50 °F (10 °C) in average temperature. Summers are usually hot, occasionally extremely hot; winters are short and cool, but with marked temperature variations, as the area is subject to alternating incursions of warm, moist air from the Gulf of Mexico (possibly producing daily high temperatures in the 70s °F.) and cold, dry air from Canada (possibly producing daily high temperatures below freezing, 32 °F, even in the 20s °F.).

Little Rock experiences a prolonged spring wet season, with heavy rainfall a distinct possibility from March to May, and a secondary wet season peaking in November and December. On average, August is the driest month, and July through September is the driest period of the year. Little Rock averages more rain than the national average, but also averages more sunny days than the national average.

Thunderstorms can occur any month of the year, but are especially frequent and severe in spring, when torrential rainfall, damaging thunderstorm winds, hail, and tornadoes are all significant threats; a secondary severe weather season peaks in November. Snow, sleet and freezing rain can occur during the winter season, when cold Canadian air at ground level is overrun by warm, moist air from the Gulf of Mexico.  Unless otherwise indicated, all normal data presented below are based on data at Bill and Hillary Clinton National Airport the official Little Rock climatology station, from the 1981−2010 normals period.

General climatology

Temperature

Other data

See also

Notes

References

External links

Little Rock, Arkansas
Little Rock
Climate of Arkansas